The United States Open Tennis Championships is a hardcourt tennis tournament held annually at Flushing Meadows, starting on the last Monday in August and lasting for two weeks. The tournament consists of five main championship events: men's and women's singles, men's and women's doubles, and mixed doubles, with additional tournaments for seniors, juniors, and wheelchair players.

In 2007, the girls' singles event was won by Kristína Kučová of the Slovak Republic who beat Urszula Radwańska of Poland, 6–3, 1–6, 7–6(7–4) in the final.

Seeds 
The seeded players are listed below. They are shown by the round in which they were eliminated.

Draw

Finals

Top half

Section 1

Section 2

Bottom half

Section 3

Section 4

External links 
 Draw

Girls' Singles
US Open, 2007 Girls' Singles